Interferon alpha-5 is a protein that in humans is encoded by the IFNA5 gene.

References

Further reading